Elele is a town in Ikwerre local government area of Rivers State, Nigeria. Madonna University is located in Elele.

References

Towns in Rivers State